Gregorio Ruiz (September 7, 1844 – February 9, 1913) was a Mexican general who participated in the Mexican Revolution.  He was born in Perote, Veracruz and he died in Mexico City in 1913.  He studied at the Heroico Colegio Militar, and by 1864 was a lieutenant of auxiliaries in the Mexican Army.  He fought against the French Intervention in Mexico and ensuing empire of Maximilian I of Mexico (1862–1867). He participated in the pacification campaigns of Puebla and Oaxaca in 1876, and in Tepic and Sinaloa in 1877 and 1888.  
 

Ruiz was a leading conspirator in Ten Tragic Days, a ten-day massacre and revolt against President Francisco Madero. Early on in the fighting, Ruiz and several subordinates were captured and executed by federal troops.

1847 births
1913 deaths
People from Veracruz
People of the Mexican Revolution
Mexican generals
Mexican Secretaries of Defense
Second French intervention in Mexico